"The One" is a song by Dublin-based alternative rock quartet Kodaline. The song was released on 12 April 2015 as the second single from the band's second studio album, Coming Up for Air (2015).

Track listing

Charts

Certifications

Release history

References

Kodaline songs
2015 songs
2015 singles
B-Unique Records singles
Songs written by Jacknife Lee
Song recordings produced by Jacknife Lee